Cargo cult programming is a style of computer programming characterized by the ritual inclusion of code or program structures that serve no real purpose. Cargo cult programming is symptomatic of a programmer not understanding either a bug they were attempting to solve or the apparent solution (compare shotgun debugging, deep magic). The term cargo cult programmer may apply when anyone inexperienced with the problem at hand copies some program code from one place to another with little understanding of how it works or whether it is required.

Cargo cult programming can also refer to the practice of applying a design pattern or coding style blindly without understanding the reasons behind that design principle. Some examples are adding unnecessary comments to self-explanatory code, overzealous adherence to the conventions of a programming paradigm, or adding deletion code for objects that garbage collection automatically collects.

Obsessive and redundant checks for null values or testing whether a collection is empty before iterating its values may be a sign of cargo cult programming. Such obsessive checks make the code less readable.

Origin

The term cargo cult as an idiom originally referred to aboriginal religions that grew up in the South Pacific after World War II. The practices of these groups centered on building elaborate mock-ups of airplanes and military landing strips in the hope of summoning the god-like beings who arrived in airplanes that had brought marvelous cargo during the war. In recent decades, anthropology has distanced itself from the term "cargo cult," which is now seen as having been reductively applied to a lot of complicated and disparate social and religious movements that arose from the stress and trauma of colonialism, and sought to attain much more varied and amorphous goals—things like self-determination—than material cargo.

Use of the term in computer programming probably derives from Richard Feynman's characterization of certain practices as cargo cult science.

Cargo cult software engineering
A related term to cargo cult programming in software engineering is cargo cult software engineering, coined by Steve McConnell.

McConnell describes software development organizations that attempt to emulate more successful development houses, either by slavishly following a software development process without understanding the reasoning behind it, or by attempting to emulate a commitment-oriented development approach (in which software developers devote large amounts of time and energy toward seeing their projects succeed) by mandating the long hours and unpaid overtime, while in successful companies these might instead be consequences of high motivation instead of causes of success.

In both cases, McConnell contends that competence ultimately determines whether a project succeeds or fails, regardless of the development approach taken; furthermore, he claims that incompetent "imposter organizations" (which merely imitate the form of successful software development organizations) are in fact engaging in what he calls cargo cult software engineering.

See also
Copy and paste programming
Cargo cult science
Magical thinking
Magic (programming)

References

Further reading

Surely You're Joking, Mr. Feynman!, Richard Feynman, W. W. Norton & Co, New York, 1985, . One of the chapters is the transcript of a 1974 Caltech commencement address, which contained the coining of "Cargo cult science".
 Cargo Cult Science, by Richard P. Feynman. Article based on his 1974 Caltech Commencement address, with pictures, as originally published in Engineering and Science, Volume 37:7, June 1974. Digitized version from Caltech Library, retrieved June 20, 2007

Computer programming folklore
Software engineering folklore